Claus Nørgaard (born 17 December 1979) is a Danish professional football coach, who is assistant head coach of  club Brentford. In a nomadic career as a head and assistant coach at domestic and international level, Nørgaard has coached several Denmark youth international teams and Superliga club SønderjyskE. His move to Premier League club Brentford in December 2022 was his first role outside his native Denmark.

Coaching career
As a youth footballer, Nørgaard grew up learning from his father Benny, who had two Danish Superliga seasons as head coach of Ikast FS in 1993–94 and 1994–95. Nørgaard followed his father to Herning Fremad, but the effects of a bicycle accident led to him quitting his playing career in order to become head coach of the club's U15 team. He moved into Vejle BK in 2003 and held various youth roles, which culminated in his appointment as head coach of the U17 team on 1 January 2008. In 2009, Nørgaard was appointed as a full-time national youth coach at the DBU and served in the role until 2012, when he was appointed to his first senior head coaching role at 2nd Division club IK Skovbakken on 3 January 2012. In May 2012, Nørgaard departed the club in order to join Vejle Kolding (then-the continuation of Vejle BK) as U19 head coach. In January 2013, Nørgaard was appointed to the role as assistant head coach of the first team at the club.

In June 2013, Nørgaard joined Superliga club Brøndby as one of two assistants to head coach Thomas Frank. He had previously worked under Frank at the DBU. Nørgaard remained in the role until the end of the 2015–16 season and took up the role of head coach of the Denmark U16 and U18 teams on 1 July 2016. Nørgaard's teams went undefeated during the first half of the 2016–17 season (which included two additional matches in charge of the U20 team) and he departed to take up the head coaching role of Superliga club SønderjyskE on 5 January 2017. Signing a -year contract, Nørgaard indicated during the first half of the 2018–19 season that he would not seek to extend it. He was sacked in December 2018.

On 18 April 2019, Nørgaard was named as assistant head coach of Superliga club Esbjerg fB. Following the sacking of head coach John Lammers on 16 September 2019, Nørgaard was named caretaker manager and presided over six matches prior to the appointment of Lars Olsen. Nørgaard was retained in his role as assistant head coach and departed the club at the end of the 2020–21 season. On 1 June 2021, Nørgaard returned to Vejle BK for the second time as head of coaching. In early September 2021, he transitioned to the role of assistant to new head coach Peter Sørensen. Nørgaard remained with the club until 31 August 2022.

In July 2022, Nørgaard was named as the head coach of Denmark U18 and he took up the role on 1 September 2022. He presided over six matches before moving to England to join Premier League club Brentford as assistant to head coach Thomas Frank on 5 December 2022. The appointment marked the third time he had worked as Frank's assistant.

Personal life 
Nørgaard grew up in Lind, Herning Municipality and has a bachelor's degree in sport. Taking inspiration from his father Benny, Nørgaard supplemented his part-time football coaching income by working as a teacher. He taught at Løsning School and as of January 2012, was teaching at Jelling Seminarium. As of April 2021, Nørgaard was living in Vejle.

Managerial statistics

References

External links 
 
 Claus Nørgaard at dbu.dk
 Claus Nørgaard at brentfordfc.com

Living people
Danish football managers
Danish expatriate sportspeople in England
Association football coaches
Danish Superliga managers
Place of birth missing (living people)
1979 births
SønderjyskE Fodbold managers
Esbjerg fB managers
Brentford F.C. non-playing staff
Sportspeople from the Central Denmark Region
People from Herning Municipality
Danish schoolteachers